At the 1952 Summer Olympics in Helsinki, nine events in sprint canoe racing were contested.  The program was unchanged from the previous Games in 1948.

Medal table

Medal summary

Men's events

Women's event

References
1952 Summer Olympics official report. pp. 624–37.
 

 
1952 Summer Olympics events
1952